Paul Parisel (15 December 1904 – 2 January 1987) was a French wrestler. He competed at the 1924 and the 1928 Summer Olympics.

References

External links
 

1904 births
1987 deaths
Olympic wrestlers of France
Wrestlers at the 1924 Summer Olympics
Wrestlers at the 1928 Summer Olympics
French male sport wrestlers
Place of birth missing
20th-century French people